Nick Waisome (born March 20, 1992) is a former American football defensive back. He attended Florida State University.

High school career
A native of Groveland, Florida, Waisome attended South Lake High School, where he was teammates with Jonotthan Harrison. Regarded as a four-star recruit by Rivals.com, Waisome was listed as the No. 8 cornerback prospect in his class.

College career
After playing exclusively on special teams during his true freshman year, Waisome became starting cornerback for the Seminoles in 2012, after Greg Reid was dismissed. He started all 14 games at cornerback, recording 21 tackles on the season. He defended eight passes and caught an interception against Clemson.

References

External links
Florida State Seminoles bio

1992 births
Living people
People from Groveland, Florida
Players of American football from Florida
American football cornerbacks
Florida State Seminoles football players